HD 137058 is a star in the southern constellation of Lupus. Eggleton and Tokovinin (2008) list it as a single star, although Nitschelm and David (2011) noted it may be a double-lined spectroscopic binary. Its apparent visual magnitude is 4.60, which is bright enough to be visible to the naked eye.

The stellar classification of the primary component is A0 V, matching an A-type main-sequence star. It is spinning rapidly with a projected rotational velocity of 300 km/s, giving it an oblate shape with an equatorial radius 22% larger than the polar radius. The star is radiating 156 times the Sun's luminosity from its photosphere at an effective temperature of 8,178 K.

References

A-type main-sequence stars
Lupus (constellation)
Lupi, k
Durchmusterung objects
137058
075501
5724